Flaxweiler is a commune and small town in south-eastern Luxembourg. It is part of the canton of Grevenmacher.

, the town of Flaxweiler, which lies in the north-west of the commune, has a population of 338.  Other towns within the commune include Beyren, Gostingen, Niederdonven, and Oberdonven.

The Mayor of Flaxweiler is the chief executive of the administration of the Luxembourgish commune of Flaxweiler. The incumbent mayor is Théo Weirich.

Population

List of former mayors

Footnotes

References

External links
 
  Official website
 

 
Communes in Grevenmacher (canton)
Towns in Luxembourg